Archeological Site CA-INY-134, in Inyo County, California near Olancha, California, is an archeological site that is listed on the National Register of Historic Places (NRHP). It has also been known as Ayer's Rock Pictograph Site, as Bob Rabbit's Pictographs, as INY-134 and as INY-105. Prehistorically, it served as a camp and as a ceremonial site. The site includes three pictograph panels carved into a monolith. The pictographs are painted in a variety of colors and depict animal and human figures.

A  area was listed on the NRHP in 2003.

The site was described by David S. Whitley, Tamara K. Whitley, and Joseph M. Simon in a 2005 publication of the Maturango Museum, located in Ridgecrest, California.

References

External links
Pictures of the Ayer's Rock pictographs

Further reading
Whitley, David S., Whitley, David S., Tamara K. Whitley, and Joseph M. Simon (2005) The Archaeology of Ayers Rock (CA-INY-134), California. Maturango Museum Publication Number 19, Ridgecrest, California: Maturango Press.  , 9780943041124 (243 pages).

Archaeological sites on the National Register of Historic Places in California
Geography of Inyo County, California
National Register of Historic Places in Inyo County, California